Mitchell Aram Glazer (born 1952/1953) is an American writer, producer, and actor.

Life and career
Glazer was born in Key Biscayne, Florida, and was raised in Miami, the son of Leonard and Zelda Glazer, an English teacher. Glazer is a relative of Sidney Glazier and musician Tom Glazer. He attended Miami Beach High School and graduated from there early in 1970. He attended Clark University before transferring to NYU. Before becoming a screenwriter, he wrote for the music publications Rolling Stone magazine and Crawdaddy!, where he met and befriended Timothy White. He is Jewish.

Glazer was a reporter for Crawdaddy! magazine in the late 1970s. He collaborated with friend and writing partner Michael O'Donoghue on several projects, most notably the holiday comedy Scrooged that starred Bill Murray. He was also good friends with John Belushi, and wrote the novelization for The Blues Brothers under the pen name "Miami Mitch."

Glazer was formerly married to actress Wendie Malick but divorced her in 1989 after seven years. In 1992 he married actress Kelly Lynch and legally adopted her daughter Shane. Glazer and Lynch own two modern architectural homes in California: one by John Lautner in the Hollywood Hills and the other by Richard Neutra in Lone Pine, California. In 2007, Glazer and Lynch were named as one of Vanity Fair's best-dressed couples.

Glazer is friends with actors Bill Murray and Mickey Rourke, who was two years ahead of him at Miami Beach High School.

Filmography

References

External links

 Schmitt, Gavin C., "Interview with Mitch Glazer, 'Passion Play'", May 2011 Interview.

1953 births
American male actors
American male screenwriters
Clark University alumni
Jewish American screenwriters
Living people
New York University alumni
People from Key Biscayne, Florida
Writers from Miami
21st-century American Jews